NASA's large strategic science missions or large strategic missions, formerly known as Flagship missions or Flagship-class missions, are the costliest and most capable NASA science spacecraft. Flagship missions exist within all four divisions of NASA's Science Mission Directorate (SMD): the astrophysics, Earth science, heliophysics and planetary science divisions.

"Large" refers to the budget of each mission, typically the most expensive mission in the scientific discipline. Within the Astrophysics Division and the Planetary Science Division, the large strategic missions are usually in excess of US$1 billion. Within Earth Science Division and Heliophysics Division, the large strategic missions are usually in excess of US$500 million. "Strategic" refers to their role advancing multiple strategic priorities set forth in plans such as the Decadal Surveys. "Science" marks these missions as primarily scientific in nature, under the Science Mission Directorate (SMD), as opposed to, e.g., human exploration missions under the Human Exploration and Operations Mission Directorate (HEOMD). The lines can be blurred, as when the Lunar Reconnaissance Orbiter began as a directed mission from the HEOMD, and was later transferred to the SMD.

Flagship missions are not under the purview of any larger "Flagship Program", unlike, e.g., Discovery-class missions that are under the purview of the Discovery Program. Unlike these competed classes that tender proposals through a competitive selection process, the development of Flagship missions is directed to a specific institution — usually a NASA center or the Jet Propulsion Laboratory — by the Science Mission Directorate. Flagship missions are developed ad-hoc, with no predetermined launch cadence or uniform budget size. Flagship missions are always Class A missions: high priority, very low risk.

History 
The Voyager probes mark the transition between the original NASA uncrewed mission programs, which were funded and organized as a series of related missions to specific targets such as the Mariner probes, Pioneer probes, Surveyor landers, Ranger probes, etc., and the modern NASA system which includes Flagships. In the early 1990s, NASA made the decision that instead of a centrally planned mission approach around pre-selected targets, mission ideas would compete for selection. The competitions would be based in cost categories, eventually turning into the Discovery and New Frontiers programs, as well as Flagship missions. While teams self-assemble to compete for Discovery and New Frontiers missions, Flagship missions are still strongly influenced by NASA Headquarters. Also, Discovery and New Frontiers missions are scheduled frequently enough that a standard process has emerged and scientists can expect that process to be followed, but Flagship missions seem to follow a different organizational and development approach every time.

A joint mission concept between NASA and ESA was developed to send a probe to study the icy satellites of the outer Solar System. There were two primary candidate missions under study: Europa Jupiter System Mission (EJSM) and Titan Saturn System Mission (TSSM). On 18 February 2009, NASA announced that both missions could proceed, but the EJSM was to be the first, departing Earth in 2020 and arriving at Jupiter in 2026.

The 2011 Planetary Science Decadal Survey report recommended to NASA that the highest priority Flagship mission for development was a sample-caching rover, called the Mars Astrobiology Explorer-Cacher (MAX-C), as an American contribution to the ExoMars project with the European Space Agency (ESA) and as precursor to a proposed Mars sample-return mission. The second highest priority mission was identified as the Jupiter Europa Orbiter, proposed to be part of the NASA-ESA Europa Jupiter System Mission – Laplace mission, and would have studied Europa in detail as a site of astrobiological interest.
Other priorities included the NASA Uranus orbiter and probe, the Enceladus Orbiter, and the Venus Climate Mission.

Under the FY2013 budget that President Obama released in February 2012, NASA terminated its participation in ExoMars due to budgetary cuts, in order to pay for the cost overruns of the James Webb Space Telescope. At that time, all proposed NASA Flagship planetary missions were put on hold indefinitely.

In December 2012, the Mars 2020 sample-caching rover, built on the same architecture as the Mars Science Laboratory (Curiosity rover), was announced on a proposed budget of US$1.5 billion. In June 2015, the Europa Clipper was approved by NASA and entered the formulation stage.

In 2016, four different space telescopes were being proposed for selection in 2020: Large Ultraviolet Optical Infrared Surveyor (LUVOIR), Habitable Exoplanet Imaging Mission (HabEx), Origins Space Telescope (OST), and the Lynx X-ray Observatory. (The four teams were due by 2019 to turn their final reports over to the National Academy of Sciences, whose independent Decadal Survey committee advises NASA on which space telescope mission should take top priority. Selection would take place in the 2020s, and launch approximately in 2035.) In May 2018 at least 3 of the 4 teams were given cost caps.

In 2022, the Planetary Science Decadel Report recommended the Uranus Orbiter and Probe and Enceladus Orbilander as top priorities, along with continuing work on Mars Sample Return.

Missions 
The 2020s decade is expected to see two planetary missions, with Mars 2020, which landed on Mars in 2021, and the Europa Clipper, expected to launch in 2024.

Of the four Great Observatories, only the Spitzer Space Telescope is not a Flagship mission. Despite an initial budget of US$2 billion, Spitzer was downscoped to a medium-size US$720 million mission.

See also 

 Discovery Program
 New Frontiers program

References 

NASA programs